Abdollah Masud may refer to:

Abdollah Masud-e Olya, a village in Hesar-e Valiyeasr Rural District, Central District, Avaj County, Qazvin Province, Iran
Abdollah Masud-e Sofla, is a village in Hesar-e Valiyeasr Rural District, Central District, Avaj County, Qazvin Province, Iran

See also
Abdullah ibn Masud